Frank Kirwin (20 October 1921 – 6 April 1997) was an Australian rules footballer who played with Collingwood in the Victorian Football League (VFL).

Notes

External links 

		
Profile on Collingwood Forever

1921 births
1997 deaths
Australian rules footballers from Victoria (Australia)
Collingwood Football Club players